Richard Salisbury Williamson (May 9, 1949 – December 8, 2013) was an American lawyer, diplomat and political advisor. He previously served as Special Envoy to Sudan under George W. Bush. Williamson was a partner at Winston & Strawn and was also Thomas J. Sharkey Distinguished Visiting Scholar at Seton Hall's Whitehead School of Diplomacy.

Early life
Williamson was born in Evanston, Illinois. He received an A.B., cum laude, in 1971 from Princeton University. He received a J.D. in 1974 from the University of Virginia School of Law, where he was executive editor of the Virginia Journal of International Law.

Career
Williamson was a practicing partner in the law office of Winston and Strawn. Earlier in the George W. Bush Administration, Williamson, who has broad foreign policy and negotiating experience, served as Ambassador to the United Nations for Special Political Affairs 
and in 2004 as United States Ambassador to the United Nations Commission on Human Rights.
Williamson played a role in the slow resolution of the conflict in the Darfur region of Sudan.

Previously, he served in senior foreign policy positions under Presidents Ronald Reagan and George H. W. Bush, including as Assistant Secretary of State for International Organization Affairs at the Department of State, and an Assistant to the President for Intergovernmental Affairs in the White House. In 1992, he was nominated by the Republican Party for United States Senate, but lost to Democrat Carol Moseley-Braun, the first black woman to be elected to the U.S. Senate. In 1999, he was selected to serve as the Chairman of the Illinois Republican Party.

Williamson was active in a wide variety of civic organizations, serving on the board of directors of the International Republican Institute; the board of the Committee in Support of Russian Civil Society; a member of the advisory committee for the International Human Rights Center at DePaul University, and a member of the Council on Foreign Relations. Williamson also was the Roberta Buffett Visiting Professor of International Studies at Northwestern University in Evanston, Illinois.

Williamson authored seven books and edited three. He wrote more than 175 articles in professional and popular periodicals.

Death
Williamson died of a cerebral hemorrhage at a Chicago hospital in 2013, aged 64.

References

External links
Williamson participated in panel discussion, Iran: The Next Military Frontier? in 2007 at the Pritzker Military Museum & Library

|-

|-

1949 births
2013 deaths
Assistants to the President of the United States
DePaul University people
George W. Bush administration personnel
Illinois Republican Party chairs
Illinois Republicans
International Republican Institute
New Trier High School alumni
Northwestern University staff
Princeton University alumni
Reagan administration personnel
Representatives of the United States to the United Nations Human Rights Council
Representatives of the United States to the United Nations International Organizations in Vienna
Seton Hall University people
United States Assistant Secretaries of State
United States Special Envoys
University of Virginia School of Law alumni
Writers from Chicago
Writers from Virginia
People associated with Winston & Strawn